is a Japanese animation studio located in Suginami, Tokyo formed by former Pierrot staff and Madhouse producer Tatsuya Ono in July 2003.

Produced series

Television series
Rozen Maiden (2004)
Rozen Maiden ~Träumend~ (2005–2006)
Rozen Maiden Ouvertüre (2006)
Hime-sama Goyōjin (2006)
Chocotto Sister (2006)
Sola (2007)
Kyōran Kazoku Nikki (2008)
Yozakura Quartet (2008)
Modern Magic Made Simple (2009)
Kämpfer (2009)
We Without Wings (2011)
Kämpfer für die Liebe (2011)
Chronicles of the Going Home Club (2013)
Futari wa Milky Holmes (2013, with J.C.Staff)
Tantei Kageki Milky Holmes TD (2015, with J.C.Staff)
Venus Project -Climax- (2015)
Dropkick on My Devil! (2018–present)
Bungo Stray Dogs Wan! (2021, with Bones)
Koikimo (2021)
Alice Gear Aegis Expansion (2023)

OVA/ONAs
Strawberry 100% (2005, episodes 1–3; co-animated with Madhouse, DR TOKYO, and Office Take Off (episode 3))
Sola (2007)
Kaitō Tenshi Twin Angel (2008)
T.P. Sakura - Time Paladin Sakura - Jikū Bōeisen (2011)
We Without Wings (2011)
Dropkick on My Devil! (2019)
Alice Gear Aegis: Doki! Actress Darake no Mermaid Grand Prix (2021)

Video Games 
 Monster Boy and the Cursed Kingdom (2018, opening and ending cinematics)

References

External links
Official website 

 
Japanese animation studios
Suginami
Animation studios in Tokyo
Japanese companies established in 2003
Mass media companies established in 2003